Naderi is a surname. Notable people with the surname include:

 Amir Naderi, Iranian film director, screenwriter, and photographer
 Firouz Naderi, Iranian-American scientist
 Kamran Afshar Naderi, Iranian architect
 Mehdi Naderi, Iranian film director
 Sayed Jafar Naderi, Afghan Ismaili